Lac Sébastien Water Aerodrome  is located  north of Saint-David-de-Falardeau on Lac Sébastien, Quebec, Canada. It is open from May until October.

References

Registered aerodromes in Saguenay–Lac-Saint-Jean
Seaplane bases in Quebec